Nicolas Touzaint (born 10 May 1980 in Angers) is a French professional horserider specialising in three-day eventing. He was born into a family already known for its performance in equestrianism: his father, Jean-Yves Touzaint, was champion of France eventing in 1975 and 1976. His uncle, Thierry Touzaint, is a national coach in the same discipline.

On 4 May 2008 he became the first Frenchman to win the Badminton Horse Trials.

Awards 

 2003: champion of Europe at Punchestown (Ireland) and second in the team event with Galan de Sauvagère.
 2004: Olympic champion team in the Olympic Games in Athens, 9th in individual with Galan de Sauvagère.
 2005: Vice-champion of Europe team to Blenheim (England) with Hildago de l'Ile in 2005.
 2005: French champion.
 2006: French champion, after only three stages, where Nicolas Touzaint finished first in six.
 2006: winner of the finals of the World Cup competitions complete with Galan de Sauvagère in Malmo (Sweden).
 2006 Winner of Boekelo CCI*** in Boekelo,  The Netherlands with Tatchou
 2007: Winner of CCI ** Compiègne with Joker of Helby
 2007: Winner of CCI *** Pratoni del Vivaro in Italy with Galan de Sauvagère
 2007: Winner of CCI *** Fontainebleau with Galan de Sauvagère
 2007: Winner of CCI *** Saumur with Tatchou
 2007: Champion of France eventing
 2007: champion of Europe in Pratoni del Vivaro (Italy) and vice-champion of Europe with a team of Galan Sauvagère
 2007: Winner of CCI **** Pau Hidalgo with the island.
 2007: After this season the Exceptional is No. 3 on the FEI world rankings list
 2008: Champion of France Contest Complete with Tatchou (Pompadour 25–26 April 2008)
 2008: winner of CCI **** Badminton (Great Britain) with Hildago de l'Ile.

References 
 Official site (in French) as translated (into English) by Google

1980 births
Living people
Event riders
French male equestrians
Olympic equestrians of France
Olympic gold medalists for France
Olympic bronze medalists for France
Olympic medalists in equestrian
Medalists at the 2004 Summer Olympics
Equestrians at the 2000 Summer Olympics
Equestrians at the 2004 Summer Olympics
Equestrians at the 2012 Summer Olympics
Equestrians at the 2020 Summer Olympics
Medalists at the 2020 Summer Olympics
European champions for France